Secunda CTL is a synthetic fuel plant owned by Sasol at Secunda, Mpumalanga in South Africa. It uses coal liquefaction to produce petroleum-like synthetic crude oil from coal. The process used by Sasol is based on the Fischer–Tropsch process. It is the largest coal liquefaction plant and the largest single emitter of greenhouse gas in the world.

Secunda CTL consists of two production units. The Sasol II unit was constructed in 1980 and the Sasol III unit in 1984.

Greenhouse gas emissions
 it is the world's largest single emitter of greenhouse gas, at 56.5 million tonnes  a year. However, if Afşin-Elbistan C power station in Turkey is built and operated at planned capacity it would emit over 60 million tonnes a year, though this project was stopped on the grounds of possible soil and air pollution. 

Air Liquide acquired the 42,000 tons/day oxygen production in 2020, with plans for 900 MW power plants to reduce  emissions.

Unique plant infrastructure

In Media
As a major component of South Africa's economy, Secunda was in turn a major target of the African National Congress during the apartheid era.  Two ANC attacks (and their aftermath) were dramatized in the 2006 film Catch a Fire.

See also
Sasol
Coal gasification

References

External links 
 

Petroleum in South Africa
Coal in South Africa
Chimneys in South Africa
Synthetic fuel facilities
Coal infrastructure
Energy infrastructure in South Africa
Economy of Mpumalanga
Secunda, Mpumalanga